In mathematics, the look-and-say sequence is the sequence of integers beginning as follows:

 1, 11, 21, 1211, 111221, 312211, 13112221, 1113213211, 31131211131221, ... .

To generate a member of the sequence from the previous member, read off the digits of the previous member, counting the number of digits in groups of the same digit.  For example:

 1 is read off as "one 1" or 11.
 11 is read off as "two 1s" or 21.
 21 is read off as "one 2, one 1" or 1211.
 1211 is read off as "one 1, one 2, two 1s" or 111221.
 111221 is read off as "three 1s, two 2s, one 1" or 312211.

The look-and-say sequence was analyzed by John Conway
after he was introduced to it by one of his students at a party.

The idea of the look-and-say sequence is similar to that of run-length encoding.

If started with any digit d from 0 to 9 then d will remain indefinitely as the last digit of the sequence. For any d other than 1, the sequence starts as follows:
 d, 1d, 111d, 311d, 13211d, 111312211d, 31131122211d, …
Ilan Vardi has called this sequence, starting with d = 3, the Conway sequence . (for d = 2, see )

Basic properties

Growth 
The sequence grows indefinitely. In fact, any variant defined by starting with a different integer seed number will (eventually) also grow indefinitely, except for the degenerate sequence: 22, 22, 22, 22, ...

Digits presence limitation 
No digits other than 1, 2, and 3 appear in the sequence, unless the seed number contains such a digit or a run of more than three of the same digit.

Cosmological decay 
Conway's cosmological theorem asserts that every sequence eventually splits ("decays") into a sequence of "atomic elements", which are finite subsequences that never again interact with their neighbors. There are 92 elements containing the digits 1, 2, and 3 only, which John Conway named after the 92 naturally-occurring chemical elements up to uranium, calling the sequence audioactive.  There are also two "transuranic" elements (Np and Pu) for each digit other than 1, 2, and 3. Below is a table of all such elements:

Growth in length 
The terms eventually grow in length by about 30% per generation. In particular, if Ln denotes the number of digits of the n-th member of the sequence, then the limit of the ratio  exists and is given by

where λ = 1.303577269034...  is an algebraic number of degree 71. This fact was proven by Conway, and the constant λ is known as Conway's constant. The same result also holds for every variant of the sequence starting with any seed other than 22.

Conway's constant as a polynomial root 
Conway's constant is the unique positive real root of the following polynomial :

This polynomial was correctly given in Conway's original Eureka article,
but in the reprinted version in the book edited by Cover and Gopinath the term  was incorrectly printed with a minus sign in front.

Popularization 
The look-and-say sequence is also popularly known as the Morris Number Sequence, after cryptographer Robert Morris, and the puzzle "What is the next number in the sequence 1, 11, 21, 1211, 111221?" is sometimes referred to as the Cuckoo's Egg, from a description of Morris in Clifford Stoll's book The Cuckoo's Egg.

Variations

There are many possible variations on the rule used to generate the look-and-say sequence. For example, to form the "pea pattern" one reads the previous term and counts all instances of each digit, listed in order of their first appearance, not just those occurring in a consecutive block. So beginning with the seed 1, the pea pattern proceeds 1, 11 ("one 1"), 21 ("two 1s"), 1211 ("one 2 and one 1"), 3112 ("three 1s and one 2"), 132112 ("one 3, two 1s and one 2"), 311322 ("three 1s, one 3 and two 2s"), etc. This version of the pea pattern eventually forms a cycle with the two "atomic" terms 23322114 and 32232114.

Other versions of the pea pattern are also possible; for example, instead of reading the digits as they first appear, one could read them in ascending order instead. In this case, the term following 21 would be 1112 ("one 1, one 2") and the term following 3112 would be 211213 ("two 1s, one 2 and one 3").

These sequences differ in several notable ways from the look-and-say sequence. Notably, unlike the Conway sequences, a given term of the pea pattern does not uniquely define the preceding term. Moreover, for any seed the pea pattern produces terms of bounded length: This bound will not typically exceed  (22 digits for decimal) and may only exceed  (30 digits for decimal radix) in length for long, degenerate, initial seeds (sequence of "100 ones", etc.). For these extreme cases, individual elements of decimal sequences immediately settle into a permutation of the form  where here the letters  are placeholders for digit counts from the preceding sequence element.

Since the sequence is infinite, and the length of each element is bounded, it must eventually repeat, due to the pigeonhole principle. As a consequence, pea pattern sequences are always eventually periodic.

See also
 Gijswijt's sequence
 Kolakoski sequence
 Autogram

Notes

References

External links 
 Conway speaking about this sequence and telling that it took him some explanations to understand the sequence.
 Implementations in many programming languages on Rosetta Code
 
 Look and Say sequence generator p
 
 A Derivation of Conway’s Degree-71 “Look-and-Say” Polynomial

Base-dependent integer sequences
Algebraic numbers
Mathematical constants
John Horton Conway